Rene Francisco Sotomayor, better known by the stage name T-Bone, is a Christian rapper. His father was Nicaraguan and his mother is Salvadoran. His name came from being called 'Bones' as a youngster because he was very skinny. The 'T' was "added to give the name a little slang edge."

Music career
According to published interview, he started rapping at the age of seven at parties and in rap battles. He was close to getting a gangsta rap record, but, after changing his life, he opened for a noted rock group at that time which led him to getting signed to his first inspirational record deal that very night.

His first three albums: Redeemed Hoodlum in 1993, Tha Life of a Hoodlum in 1995 and Tha Hoodlum's Testimony in 1996 were released on the independent Metro One record label. All three albums were characterized by being gangsta rap albums, which was rare in the inspirational music scene at the time.

In 1997, he released History of a Hoodlum, a compilation set of hits from his first three albums was released on the Metro One record label.

After a brief hiatus, T-Bone released his fourth album, and first on the Flicker Records music label, Tha Last Street Preacha, in 2001, to critical acclaim. Tha Last Street Preacha was nominated for the Rock Gospel Album Grammy Award. and saw T-Bone break into the contemporary Christian music market. It was the first rap album to debut at No. 7 on the Christian Contemporary Music charts.

2002 saw an increased exposure of T-Bone to both Christian and mainstream markets with the release of his fifth album, Gospelalphamegafunkyboogiediscomusic. The album was characterized by the guest appearance of hip-hop legend KRS-One on the title track – returning the favor of the controversial guest spot T-Bone had made on KRS-One's Spiritual Minded album earlier in the year.

2005 saw the release of his most controversial, and successful, album to date: Bone-A-Fide. Bone-A-Fides album cover controversially featured T-Bone in an image evoking Che Guevara, leading to concerns that he was promoting communist ideologies – charges he denied. Adding to the controversy were collaborations with two major secular rappers: Mack 10 and Chino XL.

Bone-A-Fide was his first album not to be produced by long-time collaborator Chase Dante and, perhaps deliberately, saw T-Bone move away from the previous West Coast sound of his earlier albums to a smoother, more East Coast sound. Also, in 2005, he was featured as Jairus in the rock opera !Hero, along with Michael Tait of Tait and dc Talk, Rebecca St. James, and Mark Stuart of Audio Adrenaline.

Bone-Appétit: Servin' Up tha Hits, a compilation set of hits from his last three albums was released on September 25, 2007.

Pa mi Dios y Pa mi Gente (For My God and For My People) was released on April 7, 2017 and Broken English was released on March 15, 2018.

Other works

Film career

T-Bone stars in the film The Rally, co-starring Kenneth Copeland. It was released in late 2009 to early 2010.

T-Bone's first major film role was in 2003, playing the role of Briggs, a rapping prisoner in the comedy-romance motion picture The Fighting Temptations, which starred Cuba Gooding Jr. and Beyoncé Knowles. In the film, T-Bone performs the song "To da River" with secular artists Lil Zane and Montell Jordan.

T-Bone also co-starred in the 2006 Paramount/MTV film All You've Got which starred Ciara and Adrienne Bailon of The Cheetah Girls.

His other films include Carman and Stephen Yake's R.I.O.T. and starred in Black Rose in 2003.

He appeared in the 2013 film I'm in Love with a Church Girl.

TV shows

 Real Videos (TBN): T-Bone has been the host of Real Videos since 1997.
 TX 10 (JC-TV): T-Bone has been the host since 2006.
 Hope and Glory (Gospel Music Channel)
 Hispanic College Quiz (NBC): T-Bone was a co-host.

Works

Albums

Collaborative works
 Appeared in the rock opera !Hero both on the recording and touring show.

Music videos
2018: "Ain't Ashamed"
2018: "Chuurch"
2016: "Volare" featuring Marcos Witt
2007: "Name Droppin'"
2005: "Can I Live" (Produced by Kenn Michael for CODEKRAFT)
2001: "Ride Wit' Me" (Produced by King Tech for Bolo Entertainment)
1996: "Throwing Out tha Wicked" (Produced by Bill Boyde)
1992: "Lyrical Assassin" (Produced by Dough Green)

Films
I'm in Love with a Church Girl (RGM Films LLC)
All You've Got (Paramount Pictures/ MTV Films)
The Fighting Temptations (Paramount Pictures/ MTV Films)
R.I.O.T. (Steven Yake Productions)
Black Rose (Short)

Other
 Performer at 2004 GMA Gospel Music's Dove Awards (UPN, PAX)
 Featured performer at the 2003 MovieGuide Awards
 Featured performer/Presenter at the 2003 Arpa Awards (Telemundo/Univision)
 Presenter at 2001 Stellar Awards
 Featured performer at the 2000 ALMA Awards with Kirk Franklin
 Television appearances include "E!", "Live at the Apollo", "MTV's "The Cut" and "From the Church to the Charts", "LA TV", "Urban Latino", "Despierta America" (Univision), "Entertainment News" (Telemundo), "Entertainment News" (MGM Latin American Network), and "Keeping it Real" (Soundtrack Channel)

Awards and nominations

Grammy Nominations
2001 Tha Last Street Preacha - Best Rock Gospel Album
2007 Category: Best Rap/Rock Gospel Album of the year: Bone-a-fide!
2008 Category: Best Gospel Performance: "With Long Life" with Israel Houghton

Visionary Award Nominations
2009 Category: Hip Hop/Rap Performer of the Year

Dove Awards
2008:
Winner of Rap/Hip-Hop Song of the Year "Name-Droppin"
2004:
 Winner of special event album (!Hero, a rock opera)
 Nomination for Rap/Hip-Hop Album (Gospelalphamegafunkyboogiediscomusic)
 Nomination for Rap/Hip-Hop Recorded Song (Raised in Harlem from !Hero)
2002:
 Nomination for Rap/Hip-Hop Album, (Tha Last Street Preacha)
 Nomination for Rap/Hip-Hop Recorded Song (Ride Wit Me)
 Nomination for Rap/Hip-Hop Recorded (King of My Life)
1997:
 Nomination for Rap/Hip Hop Album (Tha Hoodlums Testimony)
 Nomination for Rap/Hip Hop Recorded Song (Keep on Praising)
1995:
 Nomination for Rap/Hip-Hop Album (Tha Life of a Hoodlum)
 Nomination for Rap/Hip-Hop Recorded Song" (Throwing Out Tha Wicked)
1993:
 Nomination for Rap/Hip Hop Album (Redeemed Hoodlum)
 Nomination for Rap/Hip Hop Recorded Song (Lyrical Assassin)

Collaborations

Songs
 "Alabemos" by Marcos Witt ( Sigues Siendo Dios )
 "Gospelalphamegafunkyboogiediscomusic" KRS-One
 "With Long Life" Israel & New Breed
 "Lonely Man" Audio Arenaline (Lift)
 "We're a Band" Audio Adrenaline (Live from Hawaii)
 "A Few Good Men" Mack 10
 "You Can't Win" Chino XL
 "1,2,3 Praise!" Virtue
 "Joy" Feat. Joi of Brownstone
 "The Slam" tobyMac
 "The Slam [d Dubb Remix]" tobyMac
 "Rubber House" Rachael Lampa
 "With Long Life" Israel & New Breed
 "To Da River" featuring Lil' Zane and Montell Jordan (from The Fighting Temptations)
 "I'm Thankful" by Yolanda Adams (from the album Believe)
 "With long life" by Israel Houghton and New Breed
 "Te Amo," by Israel and New Breed
 "I Can't Schleep" by J.C. Crew
 "Mi Dios es grande" by Josue Del Cid
 "Wrapped Up (Remix)" by Dawkins & Dawkins
 "What a Fool I've Been" by Crystal Lewis (also features J-Raw)

Soundtracks

 "To Da River," featuring Montell Jordan and Lil' Zane from "The Fighting Temptations Soundtrack"
 "Raised in Harlem," featuring Michael Tait for !Hero
 "The Struggle Continues," featuring KRS-ONE for Spiritual Minded
 "I'm Thankful," featuring Yolanda Adams for Believe
 "Lonely Man," featuring Audio Adrenaline for Lift
 "My Story" and " God is Exalted," featuring Carman for R.I.O.T.
 "Little Jackie" and "What a Fool I've Been," featuring Crystal Lewis for Fearless
 "King of My Life," featuring Natalie LaRue for Soul Lift
 "Wrapped Up," featuring Dawkins and Dawkins for Focus
 "Sooner or Later," featuring Freedom of Soul for The 2 nd Coming
 "Watcha Gonna Do," featuring JC and the Boyz for Chill 4 A While
 "I Can't Schleep," featuring J.C. Crew for Serius Bizness
 "With Long Life," Featuring Israel and New Breed for A Deeper Level
 "Te Amo," featuring Israel and New Breed Jesus at the Center
 "Alabemos," featuring Marcos Witt (Album : Sigues Siendo Dios )

Producers
 Fredwreck (Dr. Dre, Snoop Dogg, Xzibit, Dogg Pound, Westside Connection, Mack 10)
 Warryn Campbell (Snoop Dogg, Missy Elliott, Mary Mary)
 Bosko (Kanye West, LiL Jon, E-40, Master P)
 Jimmy Jam and Terry Lewis (Janet Jackson, Michael Jackson, Prince, Whitney Houston)
 Darkchild (Destiny's Child, Brandy, Christina Aguilera, Brian McKnight, Mary J. Blige, Kirk Franklin)
 King Tech (Eminem, Sly Boogie, Chino XL, Common)
 Tommy Simms (Babyface, Eric Clapton, Carman)
 Rex Rideout (Mary J. Blige, Angie Stone, Luther Vandross, The Temptations)
 Buster and Shavoni (Yolanda Adams, Kirk Franklin, God's Property)
 Avila Bros. (Jessica Simpson, Janet Jackson, Usher, Mariah Carey, Macy Gray)
 Bobby "Bobcat" Ervin (2pac, Ice Cube, LL Cool J, Mack 10, Eazy E)
 Dwayne "Muffla" Simon (Run DMC, LL Cool J, King Tee)
 Chase (Dr. Dre, Az Yet, Rakeem, KRS-ONE, Mista Grimm)
 David Bannister (Carman, Cee-Cee Winans, Jaci Velasquez)

Additional highlights
 Lifetime music sales exceed 800,000 units
 Selected to do commercials on MTV for "The Cut"
 Did four commercials on MTV with Beyonce and Mike Epps for "The Fighting Temptations"
 Partnered in 2008 with the Hands & Feet Project, started by Christian band Audio Adrenaline, to build churches and an orphanage in Nicaragua. T-Bone's parents will be moving to Nicaragua to run a children's village.

References

External links
 

1973 births
21st-century American rappers
American people of Nicaraguan descent
American people of Salvadoran descent
American performers of Christian music
Flicker Records artists
G-funk artists
Hip hop activists
Hip hop musicians from San Francisco
Hispanic and Latino American rappers
Living people
Performers of Christian hip hop music
Rappers from the San Francisco Bay Area